Gainsborough Airport  was located adjacent to Gainsborough, Saskatchewan, Canada.

See also 
 List of airports in Saskatchewan
 List of defunct airports in Canada

References 

Argyle No. 1, Saskatchewan
Defunct airports in Saskatchewan